Luis Alexis Maldonado (born 2 September 1997) is an Argentine professional footballer who plays as a centre-back for Banfield.

Career
Maldonado's career got underway with Banfield. His first involvement with the club's senior team came in April 2016 against Patronato, when he was an unused substitute in a 0–2 victory. Maldonado made his professional debut on 14 October 2017 during an Argentine Primera División fixture with Estudiantes. A further six appearances followed for Maldonado during 2017–18.

Career statistics
.

References

External links

1997 births
Living people
Sportspeople from La Rioja Province, Argentina
Argentine footballers
Association football defenders
Argentine Primera División players
Club Atlético Banfield footballers